Potriphila is a genus of fungi in the family Odontotremataceae.

References

Ostropales
Ostropales genera